The South American section of the 2018 FIFA World Cup qualification acted as qualifiers for the 2018 FIFA World Cup held in Russia, for national teams which are members of the South American Football Confederation (CONMEBOL). A total of 4.5 slots (4 direct slots and 1 inter-confederation play-off slot) in the final tournament were available for CONMEBOL teams.

Two-time defending Copa América champions Chile did not qualify for 2018 FIFA World Cup after a 3–0 loss to Brazil on the final day of qualifying campaign, resulting in a sixth-place finish. As a result, following intercontinental play-offs against the record five-time OFC Nations Cup champions New Zealand, Peru qualified for the World Cup for the first time since 1982.

Format
The qualification structure was the same as for the previous five tournaments. The ten teams played in a league of home-and-away round-robin matches. The top four teams qualified for the 2018 FIFA World Cup, and the fifth-placed team advanced to the inter-confederation play-offs.

Unlike previous qualifying tournaments where the fixtures were pre-determined, the fixtures were determined by draw, which was held as part of the 2018 FIFA World Cup Preliminary Draw on 25 July 2015, starting 18:00 MSK (UTC+3), at the Konstantinovsky Palace in Strelna, Saint Petersburg, Russia.

For scheduling reasons, Argentina and Brazil were automatically positioned as Teams 4 and 5 respectively to ensure that no team has to play both of them on any double matchday. The remaining eight teams were drawn into one of the remaining eight positions from Teams 1 to 10 (except 4 and 5).

Entrants
All ten national teams from CONMEBOL entered qualification.

Note: Bolded teams qualified for the World Cup. Peru advanced to the inter-confederation play-offs.

Schedule
There were a total of 18 matchdays: four in 2015, eight in 2016, and six in 2017.

The inter-confederation play-offs were scheduled to be played between 6–14 November 2017.

The fixtures for CONMEBOL qualification were decided based on the draw positions, as follows:

Standings

Matches

Matchday 1

Matchday 2

Matchday 3

Matchday 4

Matchday 5

Matchday 6

Matchday 7

Matchday 8

Matchday 9

Matchday 10

Matchday 11

Matchday 12

Matchday 13

Matchday 14

Matchday 15

Matchday 16

Matchday 17

Matchday 18

Inter-confederation play-offs

The draw for the inter-confederation play-offs was held as part of the 2018 FIFA World Cup Preliminary Draw on 25 July 2015, starting 18:00 MSK (UTC+3), at the Konstantinovsky Palace in Strelna, Saint Petersburg. The fifth-placed team from CONMEBOL was drawn against the first-placed team from OFC, with the CONMEBOL team hosting the second leg.

Qualified teams
The following five teams from CONMEBOL qualified for the final tournament.

1 Bold indicates champions for that year. Italic indicates hosts for that year.

Goalscorers

Notes

References

External links
 
 Qualifiers – South America, FIFA.com
 FIFA World Cup Russia 2018, CONMEBOL.com

 
Conmebol
2018
2015 in South American football
2016 in South American football
2017 in South American football
Brazil at the 2018 FIFA World Cup
Uruguay at the 2018 FIFA World Cup
Argentina at the 2018 FIFA World Cup
Colombia at the 2018 FIFA World Cup
Peru at the 2018 FIFA World Cup